Benjamin I may refer to:

Pope Benjamin I of Alexandria, ruled in 623–662
Benjamin I of Constantinople, Ecumenical Patriarch of Constantinople in 1936–1946